Knežica is a village situated in Doljevac municipality in Serbia.

References

Populated places in Nišava District